This is a list of islands of Vanuatu by province, largely from north to south, subdivided by archipelago when appropriate. Vanuatu is usually said to contain 83 islands.

Islands 
Torba Province
Torres Islands
Hiw
Metoma (uninhabited, but formerly inhabited)
Tegua
Ngwel (uninhabited)
Linua
Lo
Toga
Banks Islands
Vet Tagde
Ureparapara
Rowa Islands (Reef Islands)
Enwut (uninhabited)
Lemeur
Vanua Lava
Kwakea
Leneu
Nawila
Ravenga
Gaua (Santa Maria Island)
Mota
Mota Lava (Saddle)
Ra Island
Merig
Mere Lava
Sanma Province
Espiritu Santo
Dany Island
Araki Island
Elephant Island
Dolphin Island
Sakao
Malohu
Malparavu
Maltinerava
Malvapevu
Malwepe
Oyster Island
Tangoa
Bokissa
Lataro
Malo
Asuleka
Malotina
Malokilikili
Aore
Tutuba
Mavea
Lathi
Penama Province
Pentecost Island
Ambae (Aoba)
Maewo
Malampa Province
Malakula
Akhamb
Arseo
Sakao
Maskelynes Islands
Avokh
Awei
Leumanang
Uluveo
Vulai
Norsup
Sowan
Tomman
Uri
Uripiv
Varo
Wala
Ambrym
Paama
Lopevi (uninhabited)
Rano
Atchin
Vao
Shefa Province
Epi
Lamen
Namuka (uninhabited)
Tefala
Shepherd Islands
Laika
Tongoa (Kuwaé)
Tongariki
Buninga
Emae (Mai)
Makura (Emwae)
Mataso (Matah)
Ewose (uninhabited)
Falea
Wot (Étarik)
Efate
Nguna
Emao
Moso (Verao)
Lelepa Island
Ekapum Lep
Erakor
Eratap (Castaway Island)
Mele (Hideaway Island)
Ifira
Iririki
Iriwiti Lep
Kakula (uninhabited)
Pele
Tafea Province
Tanna
Aniwa
Futuna
Erromango
Goat Island (uninhabited)
Vete Manung (uninhabited)
Anatom
Inyeug (Airport of Anatom)
Matthew Island (uninhabited, claimed by New Caledonia)
Hunter Island (uninhabited, claimed by New Caledonia)

External links
Islands of Vanuatu

Vanuatu
Islands